Millu Jaqhi (Aymara millu a kind of salpeter, jaqhi precipice, cliff, "salpeter cliff", also spelled Millu Jakke) is a  mountain in the Andes of Bolivia. It is located in the Oruro Department, Challapata Province, Challapata Municipality. Millu Jaqhi lies at the left bank of the Crucero River, west of the village of Ancacato.

References 

Mountains of Oruro Department